There are 197 US members of ACCU (Association of Catholic Colleges and Universities) as of 2014. They make up a significant number of the total number of Catholic universities and colleges in the world.

Adorers of the Blood of Christ 
Newman University (Wichita, Kansas)

Assumptionists (Augustinians of the Assumption) 
Assumption University (Worcester, Massachusetts)

Augustinian (Order of Saint Augustine) 
Merrimack College (North Andover, Massachusetts)
Villanova University (Villanova, Pennsylvania)

Basilian (Congregation of St. Basil) 
University of St. Thomas (Houston, Texas)

Benedictine (Order of Saint Benedict) 

- Association of Benedictine Colleges and Universities

Belmont Abbey College (Belmont, North Carolina)
Benedictine College (Atchison, Kansas)
Benedictine University (Lisle, Illinois)
Catholic Distance University (Charles Town, West Virginia)
College of Saint Benedict (St. Joseph, Minnesota)
The College of St. Scholastica (Duluth, Minnesota)
Donnelly College (Kansas City, Kansas)
Mount Marty University (Yankton, South Dakota)
Saint Anselm College (Goffstown, New Hampshire)
Saint John's University (Collegeville, Minnesota)
Saint Leo University (St. Leo, Florida)
Saint Martin's University (Lacey, Washington)
Saint Vincent College (Latrobe, Pennsylvania)
University of Mary (Bismarck, North Dakota)

Brothers of Christian Instruction 
Walsh University (North Canton, Ohio)

Christian Brothers (Congregation of Christian Brothers) 
Iona University (New Rochelle, New York)

Congregation of Sisters of St. Agnes 
Marian University (Fond du Lac, Wisconsin)

De La Salle Christian Brothers / Lasallian (Institute of the Brothers of the Christian Schools) 

Christian Brothers University (Memphis, Tennessee)
La Salle University (Philadelphia, Pennsylvania)
Lewis University (Romeoville, Illinois)
Manhattan College (Riverdale, Bronx, New York)
Saint Mary's College of California (Moraga, California)
Saint Mary's University of Minnesota (Winona, Minnesota)

Diocesan 
Carroll College (Helena, Montana)
Catholic Distance University (Charles Town, West Virginia)
Donnelly College (Kansas City, Kansas)
Gannon University (Erie, Pennsylvania)
Loras College (Dubuque, Iowa)
Mount St. Mary's University (Emmitsburg, Maryland)
St. Ambrose University (Davenport, Iowa)
St. Thomas University (Miami, Florida)
Seton Hall University (South Orange, New Jersey)
Thomas More University (Crestview Hills, Kentucky)
University of St. Thomas (Saint Paul, Minnesota)

Dominican (Order of Preachers) 
Albertus Magnus College (New Haven, Connecticut)
Aquinas College (Grand Rapids, Michigan)
Aquinas College (Nashville, Tennessee)
Aquinas Institute of Theology (St. Louis, Missouri)
Barry University (Miami, Florida)
Bayamón Central University (Bayamón, Puerto Rico)
Caldwell University (Caldwell, New Jersey)
Dominican School of Philosophy and Theology (Berkeley, California)
Dominican University (River Forest, Illinois)
Dominican University (Orangeburg, New York) 
Dominican University of California (San Rafael, California)
Edgewood College (Madison, Wisconsin)
Molloy University (Rockville Centre, New York)
Mount Saint Mary College (Newburgh, New York)
Ohio Dominican University  (Columbus, Ohio)
Providence College (Providence, Rhode Island)
St. Thomas Aquinas College (Sparkill, New York)
Siena Heights University (Adrian, Michigan)

Edmundite (Society of Saint Edmund) 
Saint Michael's College (Colchester, Vermont)

Franciscan

First Order of Saint Francis (Order of Friars Minor) 
Franciscan School of Theology (Oceanside, California)
Quincy University (Quincy, Illinois)
St. Bonaventure University (Olean, New York)
Siena College (Loudonville, New York)

Second Order of Saint Francis (Poor Clares)

Third Order of Saint Francis 
Alvernia University (Reading, Pennsylvania) - Bernardine Sisters of St. Francis
Alverno College (Milwaukee, Wisconsin) - School Sisters of St. Francis
Briar Cliff University (Sioux City, Iowa) - Sisters of St. Francis of Dubuque
Cardinal Stritch University (Milwaukee, Wisconsin) - Sisters of St. Francis of Assisi
Felician University (Lodi, New Jersey) - Felician Sisters
Franciscan Missionaries of Our Lady University (Baton Rouge, Louisiana) - known as Our Lady of the Lake College until 2016
Franciscan University of Steubenville (Steubenville, Ohio) - Franciscan Friars of the Third Order Regular
Hilbert College (Hamburg, New York) - Franciscan Sisters of St. Joseph
Lourdes University (Sylvania, Ohio) - Sisters of St. Francis Sylvania
Madonna University (Livonia, Michigan) - Felician Sisters of Livonia
Marian University (Indianapolis, Indiana) - Sisters of St. Francis Oldenburg
Neumann University (Aston, Pennsylvania) - Sisters of St. Francis of Philadelphia
St. Francis College (Brooklyn Heights, New York) - Franciscan Brothers of Brooklyn
Saint Francis University (Loretto, Pennsylvania) - Franciscan Friars of the Third Order Regular
University of Saint Francis (Fort Wayne, Indiana) - Sisters of St. Francis of Perpetual Adoration
University of St. Francis (Joliet, Illinois) - Sisters of St. Francis of Mary Immaculate
Villa Maria College (Buffalo, New York) - Felician Sisters
Viterbo University (La Crosse, Wisconsin) - Franciscan Sisters of Perpetual Adoration

Grey Nuns 
D'Youville University (Buffalo, New York)

Holy Cross (Congregation of Holy Cross) 
Holy Cross College (Notre Dame, Indiana) - also associated with Brothers of Holy Cross
King's College (Wilkes-Barre, Pennsylvania)
Our Lady of Holy Cross College (New Orleans, Louisiana)
St. Edward's University (Austin, Texas)
Saint Mary's College (Notre Dame, Indiana) - Sisters of the Holy Cross
Stonehill College (Easton, Massachusetts)
University of Notre Dame (Notre Dame, Indiana)
University of Portland (Portland, Oregon)

Jesuit (Society of Jesus) 
 
Boston College (Chestnut Hill, Massachusetts) Official site
Canisius College (Buffalo, New York) Official site
College of the Holy Cross (Worcester, Massachusetts) Official site
Creighton University (Omaha, Nebraska) Official site
Fairfield University (Fairfield, Connecticut) Official site
Fordham University (Bronx New York, NY & West Harrison, New York) Official site
Georgetown University (Washington, DC) Official site
Gonzaga University (Spokane, Washington) Official site
John Carroll University (University Heights, Ohio) Official site
Le Moyne College (Syracuse, New York) Official site
Loyola Marymount University (Los Angeles, California) Official site
Loyola University Chicago (Chicago, Illinois) Official site
Loyola University Maryland (Baltimore, Maryland) Official site
Loyola University New Orleans (New Orleans, Louisiana) Official site
Marquette University (Milwaukee, Wisconsin) Official site
Regis University (Denver, Colorado) Official site
Rockhurst University (Kansas City, Missouri) Official site
Saint Joseph's University (Philadelphia, Pennsylvania) Official site
Saint Louis University (St. Louis, Missouri) Official site
Saint Peter's University (Jersey City, New Jersey) Official site
Santa Clara University (Santa Clara, California) Official site
Seattle University (Seattle, Washington) Official site
Spring Hill College (Mobile, Alabama) Official site
University of Detroit Mercy (Detroit, Michigan) Official site
University of San Francisco (San Francisco, California) Official site
University of Scranton (Scranton, Pennsylvania) Official site
Xavier University (Cincinnati, Ohio) Official site

Missionaries of the Precious Blood 
Calumet College of St. Joseph (Whiting, Indiana)  Official site

Missionary Sisters of the Sacred Heart of Jesus 
Cabrini University (Radnor, Pennsylvania) Official site

Norbertine (Order of Canons Regular of Prémontré) 
St. Norbert College (De Pere, Wisconsin)  Official site

Oblates of St. Francis de Sales 
DeSales University (Center Valley, Pennsylvania) Official site

Pontifical 
The Catholic University of America (Washington, D.C.)  Official site
Pontifical Catholic University of Puerto Rico  (Ponce, Puerto Rico)  Official site

School Sisters of Notre Dame 
Mount Mary University (Milwaukee, Wisconsin)
Notre Dame of Maryland University (Baltimore, Maryland)

Sinsinawa Dominican Sisters 
Dominican University (River Forest, Illinois) Official site
Edgewood College (Madison, Wisconsin) Official site

Sisters of Charity 
Clarke University (Dubuque, Iowa), Sisters of Charity of the Blessed Virgin Mary
College of Mount Saint Vincent (Riverdale, Bronx, New York), Sisters of Charity of New York
College of Saint Elizabeth (Morristown, New Jersey), Sisters of Charity of Saint Elizabeth of New Jersey
Mount St. Joseph University (Cincinnati, Ohio), Sisters of Charity of Ohio Official site
Seton Hill University (Greensburg, Pennsylvania), Sisters of Charity of Seton Hill of Greensburg
Spalding University (Louisville, Kentucky), Sisters of Charity of Nazareth
University of the Incarnate Word (San Antonio, Texas), Sisters of Charity of the Incarnate Word
University of Saint Mary (Leavenworth, Kansas), Sisters of Charity of Leavenworth Official site

Sisters of Divine Providence (Congregation of Divine Providence) 
La Roche College (McCandless, Pennsylvania), Sisters of Divine Providence, Maria de la Roche Province
Our Lady of the Lake University (San Antonio, Texas)

Sisters of the Holy Family of Nazareth 
Holy Family University (Philadelphia, Pennsylvania)

Sisters of the Holy Names of Jesus and Mary 
Holy Names University (Oakland, California) Official site

Sisters of Mercy 
- Conference for Mercy Higher Education

Carlow University (Pittsburgh, Pennsylvania) Official site
College of Saint Mary (Omaha, Nebraska) Official site
Georgian Court University (Lakewood, New Jersey) Official site
Gwynedd Mercy University (Gwynedd Valley, Pennsylvania) Official site
Maria College (Albany, New York) Official site
Mercyhurst University (Erie, Pennsylvania) Official site
Misericordia University (Dallas, Pennsylvania) Official site
Mount Aloysius College (Cresson, Pennsylvania) Official site
Mount Mercy University (Cedar Rapids, Iowa) Official site
Saint Joseph's College of Maine (Standish, Maine) Official site
St. Xavier University  (Chicago, Illinois) Official site
Salve Regina University (Newport, Rhode Island) Official site
Trocaire College (Buffalo, New York) Official site
University of Detroit Mercy (Detroit, Michigan) Official site
University of Saint Joseph (West Hartford, Connecticut) Official site

Sisters of Notre Dame of Coesfeld 
Notre Dame College (South Euclid, Ohio), Sisters of Notre Dame of Chardon, Ohio

Sisters of Notre Dame de Namur
Emmanuel College (Boston, Massachusetts)
Trinity Washington University (Washington, D.C.)

Sisters of the Presentation of Mary 
Rivier University (Nashua, New Hampshire)

Sisters of Providence (Montreal) 
University of Providence (Great Falls, Montana) Official site

Sisters of Providence of Saint Mary-of-the-Woods 
Saint Mary-of-the-Woods College (Terre Haute, Indiana)

Sisters of Saint Anne 
Anna Maria College (Paxton, Massachusetts)

Sisters of St. Basil the Great (Ukrainian Catholic Church in the US) 
Manor College (Jenkintown, Pennsylvania)

Sisters of St. Joseph 
- Association of Colleges of Sisters of Saint Joseph

Avila University (Kansas City, Missouri)
Chestnut Hill College (Philadelphia, Pennsylvania)
The College of Saint Rose (Albany, New York) Official site
Elms College (Chicopee, Massachusetts) Official site
Fontbonne University (St. Louis, Missouri)
Mount St. Mary's University (Los Angeles, California) Official site
Regis College (Weston, Massachusetts)
St. Catherine University (St. Paul, Minnesota)
St. Joseph's University (Brooklyn, New York)

Sisters, Servants of the Immaculate Heart of Mary 
Immaculata University (Malvern, Pennsylvania)
Marywood University (Scranton, Pennsylvania)

Society of the Holy Child Jesus 
Rosemont College (Rosemont, Pennsylvania)

Society of Mary (Marianists) 
- Association of Marianist Universities

Chaminade University of Honolulu (Honolulu, Hawaii) Official site
St. Mary's University (San Antonio, Texas) Official site
University of Dayton (Dayton, Ohio) Official site

Spiritans (Congregation of the Holy Spirit) 
Duquesne University of the Holy Spirit (Pittsburgh, Pennsylvania) Official site

Ursuline (Sisters of Mount Saint Joseph) 
Brescia University (Owensboro, Kentucky) Official site

Vincentian (Congregation of the Mission) 
DePaul University (Chicago, Illinois)
Niagara University (Lewiston, New York)
St. John's University (Jamaica, New York)

Independent 
Augustine Institute (Denver, Colorado) Official site
Ave Maria University (Ave Maria, Florida) Official site
Bellarmine University (Louisville, Kentucky) Official site
Catholic Distance University (Charles Town, West Virginia) Official site
Christendom College (Front Royal, Virginia) Official site
Dominican University of California (San Rafael, California) Official site, founded in 1890 by the Dominican Sisters of San Rafael as an independent university of Catholic heritage
Holy Apostles College and Seminary (Cromwell, Connecticut) Official site
Holy Spirit College (Atlanta, Georgia)
John Paul the Great Catholic University (San Diego, California) Official site
Magdalen College of the Liberal Arts (Warner, New Hampshire) Official site
Marymount University (Arlington, Virginia) Official site, founded in 1950 by the Religious of the Sacred Heart of Mary
Mexican American Catholic College (San Antonio, Texas) Official site, the Americas' only bilingual, bi-cultural Catholic college, formerly the Mexican American Cultural Center
Sacred Heart University (Fairfield, Connecticut)
Thomas Aquinas College (Santa Paula, California) Official site
Thomas More College of Liberal Arts (Merrimack, New Hampshire) Official site
University of Dallas (Irving, Texas) Official site
University of the Sacred Heart (San Juan, Puerto Rico) Official site
University of San Diego (San Diego, California) Official site
Ursuline College (Pepper Pike, Ohio) Official site, maintains close ties to its founding religious congregation, the Ursuline Sisters of Cleveland
Wyoming Catholic College (Lander, Wyoming) Official site
Xavier University of Louisiana (New Orleans, Louisiana), the only Catholic HBCU, founded by the Sisters of the Blessed Sacrament

Catholic dental schools 
 Creighton University School of Dentistry (Omaha, Nebraska)
 Marquette University School of Dentistry (Milwaukee, Wisconsin)
 University of Detroit Mercy School of Dentistry (Detroit, Michigan)

Catholic engineering schools 
Catholic University School of Engineering (Washington, D.C.)
Christian Brothers University School of Engineering (Memphis, Tennessee)
Fairfield University School of Engineering (Fairfield, Connecticut)
Gannon University College of Engineering and Business (Erie, Pennsylvania)
Gonzaga University School of Engineering and Applied Science (Spokane, Washington)
Loyola Marymount University College of Science and Engineering (Los Angeles, California)
Manhattan College School of Engineering (Riverdale, New York)
Marquette University College of Engineering (Milwaukee, Wisconsin)
Saint Louis University Parks College of Engineering, Aviation and Technology (St. Louis, Missouri)
Sacred Heart University (Fairfield, Connecticut)
Saint Martin's University Hal and Inge Marcus School of Engineering (Lacey, Washington)
St. Mary's University School of Science, Engineering and Technology (San Antonio, Texas)
Santa Clara University School of Engineering (Santa Clara, California)
Seattle University College of Science and Engineering (Seattle, Washington)
University of Dayton School of Engineering (Dayton, Ohio)
University of Detroit Mercy College of Engineering and Science (Detroit, Michigan)
University of Mary School of Engineering
University of Notre Dame College of Engineering (South Bend, Indiana)
University of Portland Shiley School of Engineering (Portland, Oregon)
University of St. Thomas School of Engineering (St. Paul, Minnesota)
University of San Diego Shiley-Marcos School of Engineering (San Diego, California)
Villanova University College of Engineering (Villanova, Pennsylvania)

Catholic law schools 
 Ave Maria School of Law (Naples, Florida)
 Barry University School of Law (Orlando, Florida)
 Boston College Law School (Newton, Massachusetts)
 Columbus School of Law (The Catholic University of America, Washington, D.C.)
 Creighton University School of Law (Omaha, Nebraska)
 DePaul University College of Law (Chicago, Illinois)
 Duquesne University School of Law (Pittsburgh, Pennsylvania)
 Fordham University School of Law (New York, New York)
 Georgetown University Law Center (Washington, D.C.)
 Gonzaga University School of Law (Spokane, Washington)
 Loyola Law School (Los Angeles, California)
 Loyola University Chicago School of Law (Chicago, Illinois)
 Loyola University New Orleans College of Law (New Orleans, Louisiana)
 Marquette University Law School (Milwaukee, Wisconsin)
 Notre Dame Law School (Notre Dame, Indiana) 
 Pontifical Catholic University of Puerto Rico School of Law (Ponce, Puerto Rico)
 St. John's University School of Law (Jamaica, New York)
 Saint Louis University School of Law (St. Louis, Missouri)
 St. Mary's University School of Law (San Antonio, Texas)
 St. Thomas University School of Law (Miami, Florida)
 Santa Clara University School of Law (Santa Clara, California)
 Seattle University School of Law (Seattle, Washington)
 Seton Hall University School of Law (Newark, New Jersey)
 University of Dayton School of Law (Dayton, Ohio)
 University of Detroit Mercy (Detroit, Michigan)
 University of St. Thomas School of Law (Minneapolis, Minnesota)
 University of San Diego School of Law (San Diego, California)
 University of San Francisco School of Law (San Francisco, California)
 Villanova University School of Law (Villanova, Pennsylvania)

Catholic medical schools 
Creighton University School of Medicine (Omaha, Nebraska)
Georgetown University School of Medicine (Washington, D.C.)
Loyola University Chicago - Stritch School of Medicine (Maywood, Illinois)
Marian University College of Osteopathic Medicine (Indianapolis, Indiana)
Saint Louis University School of Medicine (St. Louis, Missouri)
University of the Incarnate Word School of Osteopathic Medicine (San Antonio, Texas)

Catholic schools of professional psychology 
Divine Mercy University, Institute for the Psychological Sciences (Arlington, Virginia)

Catholic Honor Society 

 Delta Epsilon Sigma is the official national scholastic honor society for students, faculty, and alumni of colleges and universities with a Catholic tradition.

Formerly Catholic universities and colleges 
Schools that have ended or renounced their affiliation with the Church:
Daemen University (Amherst, New York) – founded by the Sisters of St. Francis of Penance and Christian Charity
Lynn University (Boca Raton, Florida) – formerly Marymount College of Boca Raton
Manhattanville College (Purchase, New York) – renounced affiliation with the Catholic Church in 1971
Marist College (Poughkeepsie, New York) – renounced affiliation with the Catholic Church in 1969
Marymount Manhattan College (New York, New York)
Maryville University (St. Louis, Missouri) – renounced affiliation with the Catholic Church in 1972
Medical College of Wisconsin (Milwaukee, Wisconsin) – formerly Marquette University College of Medicine
Mercy College (Dobbs Ferry, New York) - renounced affiliation with the Catholic Church in the 1970’s.
Nazareth College (Rochester, New York) – founded by the Sisters of St. Joseph (SSJ) of Rochester
New York Medical College (Valhalla, New York) – now part of Touro College
St. John Fisher College (Rochester, New York) – founded by the Basilian Fathers (CSB); renounced affiliation with the Catholic Church in 1968
Stevenson University (Stevenson, Maryland) – formerly Villa Julie College; founded by the Sisters of Notre Dame de Namur in 1947; renounced affiliation with the Catholic Church in 1967
University of Medicine and Dentistry of New Jersey (Newark, New Jersey) – sold by Seton Hall University to the State of New Jersey in the 1960s
Webster University (Webster Groves, Missouri) – founded by the Sisters of Loretto; renounced affiliation with the Catholic Church in 1967

Defunct Catholic universities and colleges 
Barat College (Lake Forest, Illinois)
Cardinal Cushing College (Brookline, Massachusetts)
College of Santa Fe (became secular as Santa Fe University of Art and Design, then closed) (Santa Fe, New Mexico)
Cardinal Newman College (St. Louis, Missouri)
Claver College (Guthrie, Oklahoma)
College of New Rochelle (New Rochelle, New York) - founded in 1904 as New York state's first Catholic college for women; merged with Mercy College (Dobbs Ferry, New York)
College of Saint Mary-of-the-Wasatch (Salt Lake City, Utah)
College of Saint Teresa (Winona, Minnesota)
College of Saint Thomas More (Fort Worth, Texas) Official site
Duchesne College (Omaha, Nebraska)
Dunbarton College of the Holy Cross (Washington, D.C.)
Holy Family College (Manitowoc, Wisconsin)
Holy Name College (Washington, D.C.)
Immaculate Heart College (Los Angeles, California)
Ladycliff College (Highland Falls, New York)
Lexington College (Chicago, Illinois) Official site
Marian Court College (Swampscott, Massachusetts) Official site
Mary Manse College (Toledo, Ohio), active from 1922 to 1975, was operated by the Ursuline Order of nuns.
Marycrest College (Davenport, Iowa)
Marygrove College (Detroit, Michigan)
Marylhurst University (Portland, Oregon) Official site
Marymount College (Salina, Kansas)
Marymount College (Tarrytown, New York)
Mount Saint Mary College (Hooksett, New Hampshire)
Notre Dame College (Manchester, New Hampshire)
Notre Dame de Namur University (Belmont, California), now a graduate school; founded in 1851 by the Sisters of Notre Dame de Namur 
Oblate College (Washington, D.C.) 
St. Catharine College (St. Catharine, Kentucky) 
St. Gregory's University (Shawnee, Oklahoma)
Saint Joseph's College (Rensselaer, Indiana) Official site
St. Mary of the Plains College (Dodge City, Kansas)
St. Viator College (Bourbonnais, Illinois)
Southern Benedictine College (Cullman, Alabama)
Southern Catholic College (Dawsonville, Georgia)
Trinity College of Vermont (Burlington, Vermont)
University of Albuquerque (Albuquerque, New Mexico)

References 

 
United States
Lists of universities and colleges in the United States